Kaunakakai is a census-designated place (CDP) in Maui County, Hawaii,  United States.  It is the largest town on the island of Molokai.  The population was 3,419 at the 2020 census. It has the largest port on the island and the longest pier in Hawaii. The town was made famous in the 1930s by the song "The Cockeyed Mayor of Kaunakakai", beginning an ongoing tradition of designating an honorary mayor for the town.

History
In the mid-1800s, King Kamehameha V sometimes spent his summers on Molokai at a home in Kaunakakai. The main street of Kaunakakai, Ala Malama Avenue, was named after the king's summer home.

Around mid-1935, the song was written for the celebration of the first honorary mayor, the cockeyed mayor of Kaunahahai, during the vacation visit by Academy Award winning Best Actor in 1929, Warner Baxter. The "election" was a seven day celebration by the locals and Baxter's vacation party.

Geography
Kaunakakai is located at  (21.088968, -157.012542).

Climate
Kaunakakai has a tropical savannah (As) climate.

Demographics

As of the census of 2010, there were 3,425 people, 1,254 households, and 850 families residing in the CDP. The racial makeup of the CDP was 15.4% White, 0.5% Black, 0.3% Native American, 22.2% Asian (of whom 15.5% were Filipino), 22.4% Native Hawaiian, 0.3% from other races, and 37.4% from two or more races. Hispanic or Latino of any race were 5.9% of the population.

There were 1,254 households, out of which 24.6% had children under the age of 18 living with them, 46.3% were married couples living together, 15.7% had a female householder with no husband present, and 33.2% were non-families. 22.5% of all households were made up of individuals, and 27% of households had someone living alone who was 65 years of age or older.  The average household size was 2.73 and the average family size was 3.32.

As of the census of 2000, in the CDP the population was spread out, with 31.8% under the age of 18, 8.3% from 18 to 24, 22.6% from 25 to 44, 21.6% from 45 to 64, and 15.2% who were 65 years of age or older.  The median age was 36 years. For every 100 females, there were 91.8 males.  For every 100 females age 18 and over, there were 88.3 males.

The median income for a household in the CDP was $34,492, and the median income for a family was $39,348. Males had a median income of $30,543 versus $22,337 for females. The per capita income for the CDP was $14,201.  About 15.5% of families and 20.6% of the population were below the poverty line, including 27.4% of those under age 18 and 11.8% of those age 65 or over.

References

External links

Census-designated places in Maui County, Hawaii
Populated places on Molokai
Populated coastal places in Hawaii